Petrus "Piet" Godefridus de Brouwer (5 October 1880 – 5 October 1953) was an archer from the Netherlands. He was born in Gestel, North Brabant and died in Eindhoven, North Brabant.

He represented his native country at the 1920 Summer Olympics in Antwerp, Belgium. There he won the gold medal in the Men's Team Event (28 m), alongside Joep Packbiers, Janus Theeuwes, Driekske van Bussel, Jo van Gastel, Tiest van Gestel, Janus van Merrienboer, and Theo Willems.

References

External links
 profile
 Dutch Olympic Committee 

1880 births
1953 deaths
Dutch male archers
Archers at the 1920 Summer Olympics
Olympic archers of the Netherlands
Olympic gold medalists for the Netherlands
Sportspeople from Eindhoven
Olympic medalists in archery
Medalists at the 1920 Summer Olympics